Herbert Burdell Maxson (1849/1850–1927) was a miner and civil engineer in Arizona and later deputy United States surveyor for Nevada. He was one of the pioneers of the National Irrigation Congress, a group concerned with water resources in the Western United States, serving for eight years as its secretary. He also served on the Panama Canal staff.

Biography
Maxson was born in Leonardsville, New York, and came to Arizona in 1870. He moved to Nevada in 1888, where he was elected county surveyor of Washoe County and was later appointed to the federal deputy surveyor post. He was a member of the Republican National Committee. He came to Los Angeles, California, about 1923 and was on the Traffic Commission and the Los Angeles Airport Committee. He was a member of  the California State Republican Committee.

He died January 26, 1927, at the age of seventy-seven, leaving a widow, Mollie S. Maxson, and children H.H., E.L. and Evelyn Maxson, all of Los Angeles.

References

1927 deaths
American civil engineers
Year of birth uncertain